Distributed manufacturing also known as distributed production, cloud producing, distributed digital manufacturing, and local manufacturing is a form of decentralized manufacturing practiced by enterprises using a network of geographically dispersed manufacturing facilities that are coordinated using information technology. It can also refer to local manufacture via the historic cottage industry model, or manufacturing that takes place in the homes of consumers.

Enterprise
In enterprise environments, the primary attribute of distributed manufacturing is the ability to create value at geographically dispersed locations. For example, shipping costs could be minimized when products are built geographically close to their intended markets. Also, products manufactured in a number of small facilities distributed over a wide area can be customized with details adapted to individual or regional tastes. Manufacturing components in different physical locations and then managing the supply chain to bring them together for final assembly of a product is also considered a form of distributed manufacturing. Digital networks combined with additive manufacturing allow companies a decentralized and geographically independent distributed production (cloud manufacturing).

Consumer
Within the maker movement and DIY culture, small scale production by consumers often using peer-to-peer resources is being referred to as distributed manufacturing. Consumers download digital designs from an open design repository website like Youmagine or Thingiverse and produce a product for low costs through a distributed network of 3D printing services such as 3D Hubs, Geomiq. In the most distributed form of distributed manufacturing the consumer becomes a prosumer and manufacturers products at home with an open-source 3-D printer such as the RepRap. In 2013 a desktop 3-D printer could be economically justified as a personal product fabricator and the number of free and open hardware designs were growing exponentially. Today there are millions of open hardware product designs at hundreds of repositories and there is some evidence consumers are 3-D printing to save money. For example, 2017 case studies probed the quality of: (1) six common complex toys; (2) Lego blocks; and (3) the customizability of open source board games and found that all filaments analyzed saved the prosumer over 75% of the cost of commercially available true alternative toys and over 90% for recyclebot filament. Overall, these results indicate a single 3D printing repository, MyMiniFactory,  is saving consumers well over $60 million/year in offset purchases of only toys. These 3-D printers can now be used to make sophisticated high-value products like scientific instruments. Similarly, a study in 2022 found that 81% of open source designs provided economic savings and the total savings for the 3D printing community is more than $35 million from downloading only the top 100 products at YouMagine. In general, the savings are largest when compared to conventional products when prosumers use recycled materials in 'distributed recycling and additive manufacturing' (DRAM).

Social change
Some call attention to the conjunction of commons-based peer production with distributed manufacturing techniques. The self-reinforced fantasy of a system of eternal growth can be overcome with the development of economies of scope, and here, the civil society can play an important role contributing to the raising of the whole productive structure to a higher plateau of more sustainable and customised productivity. Further, it is true that many issues, problems and threats rise due to the large democratization of the means of production, and especially regarding the physical ones. For instance, the recyclability of advanced nanomaterials is still questioned; weapons manufacturing could become easier; not to mention the implications on counterfeiting and on "intellectual property". It might be maintained that in contrast to the industrial paradigm whose competitive dynamics were about economies of scale, commons-based peer production and distributed manufacturing could develop economies of scope. While the advantages of scale rest on cheap global transportation,  the economies of scope share infrastructure costs (intangible and tangible productive resources), taking advantage of the capabilities of the fabrication tools. And following Neil Gershenfeld in that “some of the least developed parts of the world need some of the most advanced technologies”, commons-based peer production and distributed manufacturing may offer the necessary tools for thinking globally but act locally in response to certain problems and needs. As well as supporting individual personal manufacturing  social and economic benefits are expected to result from the development of local production economies. In particular, the humanitarian and development sector are becoming increasingly interested in how distributed manufacturing can overcome the supply chain challenges of last mile distribution.

References

Manufactured goods
Free software
Digital manufacturing
3D printing
Cloud computing